Lotten Sjödén (born 7 December 1994) is a Swedish biathlete. She was part of the Swedish Junior National Team for the 2013/2014 season.

She won a silver medal in the youth women relay at the Biathlon Junior World Championships 2012 in Kontiolahti, Finland.

She competed in the first Winter Youth Olympics in 2012 in Innsbruck, Austria, ending both sprint and pursuit competitions in 4th place.

References

External links 
 IBU profile

1994 births
Swedish female biathletes
Living people
Biathletes at the 2012 Winter Youth Olympics